The Richmond Art Museum was founded in 1898 as the Art Association of Richmond, Indiana.  Artist John Elwood Bundy and author and attorney William Dudley Foulke were instrumental in the founding.

Permanent collection 
Its collection includes important works of American Impressionists, particularly from the Hoosier Group, the Richmond Group and the Taos School.  Important ceramics including a significant collection of the work of the Overbeck Sisters are part of the collection housed in McGuire Memorial Hall at Richmond High School.  The museum is believed to be the only public art museum connected with a public high school.  An icon of the collection is a very large self-portrait of the American impressionist William Merritt Chase painted for the museum in 1915-16.

Some of the more important artists represented in the collection are:

 William Merritt Chase
 Frank Duveneck
 Henry Mosler
 Walter Shirlaw
 William Aiken Walker
 William Wendt
 Charles Courtney Curran
 William Victor Higgins
 Ben Foster
 Robert Reid
 Asher Durand
 Childe Hassam
 Adam Emory Albright
 E. Irving Couse
 Leonard Ochtman
 John Christen Johansen
 Francis Focer Brown
 Guy Carleton Wiggins
 Jane Peterson
 Janet Scudder
 Paul Weber
 Harry Mills Walcott
 Albert Lorey Groll
 Gordon Grant
 Louis Betts
 De Scott Evans
 Marcus Mote
 Frederick Judd Waugh
 Wayman Elbridge Adams
 Aminah Robinson

External links

 Official Site

Art museums and galleries in Indiana
Art museums established in 1898
Museums in Richmond, Indiana
1898 establishments in Indiana